{{DISPLAYTITLE:C9H6O6}}
The molecular formula C9H6O6 may refer to:

 Hemimellitic acid (benzene-1,2,3-tricarboxylic acid)
 Trimellitic acid (benzene-1,2,4-tricarboxylic acid)
 Trimesic acid (benzene-1,3,5-tricarboxylic acid)

Molecular formulas